A. labiata may refer to:

Aristolochia labiata, a flowering plant species
Aurelia labiata, a jellyfish species